The Tunku Laksamana Abdul Jalil Mosque is a mosque in Johor Bahru, Johor, Malaysia. The mosque is located at the Royal Malaysia Police Johor Contingent Police Headquarters in Jalan Tebrau. This modern futuristic mosque was officially opened on 28 August 2015 by the Sultan Ibrahim Ismail of Johor and was named after the honour of his late fourth son, Tunku Abdul Jalil Sultan Ibrahim, Tunku Laksamana of Johor who was served as a police inspector of the Special Action Unit (UTK) branch. Tunku Abdul Jalil died four months later on 5 December 2015, age of 25 due to cancer.

History
The mosque was constructed from 2012 and was completed on 2015.

Architecture
Modern futuristic mosque

See also
 Islam in Malaysia

2015 establishments in Malaysia
Buildings and structures in Johor Bahru
Mosques completed in 2015
Mosques in Johor